The 1973–74 season was Manchester United's 72nd season in the Football League, and their 29th consecutive season in the top division of English football. It was the first full season in charge for manager Tommy Docherty, who had been appointed the previous December following the dismissal of Frank O'Farrell. Only six seasons after winning the European Cup, United were relegated, meaning that they would be a Second Division club for the first time since 1938.

Having been persuaded to return to the team after walking out during the previous season, the troubled George Best briefly returned to the side, but played his last game for the club on New Year's Day, and his contract was cancelled the following season after more than a decade at Old Trafford.

Docherty took the unusual step of appointing goalkeeper Alex Stepney as the team's penalty taker. After 12 games, Stepney had converted two penalties, which made him the club's joint top scorer, a position he held for ten matches.

United began the season with two victories in their first three games, but then recorded only four wins in twenty League games between September and March. A late-season run of victories raised the prospect of survival, but United stumbled as the season drew to an end. On the last full day of the season, United could survive only by winning their home game against Manchester City and then their rearranged game at Stoke City, provided that points were dropped by other relegation candidates, all of which had only one game remaining. In the event, United lost both games whilst their rivals' results meant that they would have been relegated anyway.

The scorer of what proved to be the winning goal for Manchester City in United's penultimate game was former United player Denis Law, who scored with a back-heel in the 81st minute. He did not celebrate the goal, and was substituted shortly afterwards. The goal triggered a series of pitch invasions by Manchester United fans, perhaps hoping to get the match replayed, that forced the referee to abandon the game in the 85th minute. After a review, the Football League decided that the result should stand.

This was the season in which the Football League increased the number of relegation places from two to three, and it is sometimes incorrectly stated that by winning at Old Trafford Manchester City "relegated" United. In fact, it was Birmingham City's win over Norwich City and West Ham United's point against Liverpool that sealed United's fate, since, with a win still worth only two points, United could not have caught Birmingham and West Ham even if they had won their last two fixtures. However, City's victory and Southampton's win at Everton meant that United finished in 21st place, and would still have been relegated under the old system.

Already relegated, United then lost their last game of the season, against sixth-placed Stoke City.

In spite of the relegation to the Second Division, the club's directors decided not to sack Docherty, placing their confidence in him to restore the club's First Division status at the first attempt.

First Division

FA Cup

League Cup

Squad statistics

References

Manchester United F.C. seasons
Manchester United